Beverly Bowes (born September 9, 1965) is a former noted American international tennis player. She competed in the Australian Open six times, from 1987 to 1993.

Career finals

Singles (1 runner-up)

Doubles (1 runner-up)

References 

1965 births
Living people
American female tennis players
Goodwill Games medalists in tennis
Competitors at the 1986 Goodwill Games
21st-century American women